is a Japanese one-shot manga written and illustrated by Mio Tennohji. It is licensed in North America by 801 Media, which released it in January 2009.

Reception
Leroy Douresseaux, writing for the Comic Book Bin, felt that the theme of the manga was that "meaningless sex" can take place quickly, whereas building a real relationship takes time and is fraught with difficulties.  Douressaux praised Tennohji's artwork in her naive, yet non-feminine ukes.  Rachel Bentham, writing for Active Anime, felt that Tennohji's art set the manga apart.

See also
List of manga magazines

References

External links

Yaoi anime and manga
Digital Manga Publishing titles